Xihongmen Area is an area and a town situated on northern Daxing District, Beijing, China. It borders Huaxiang and Nanyuan Subdistricts in its north, Jiugong and Yinghai Towns in its east, Qingyundian and Huangcun Towns in its southeast, as well as Guanyinsi and Gaomidian Subdistricts in its southwest. It was home to 179,974 residents as of 2020.

The region was called Xihongmen because of the west gate of Imperial Southern Garden that used to exist within the area during Ming and Qing dynasties.

History

Administrative divisions 
By the end of 2021, Xihongmen Area comprised 23 subdivisions, of which 20 were residential communities, 2 were villages and 1 was an industrial area:

Gallery

See also 

 List of township-level divisions of Beijing

References 

Towns in Beijing
Daxing District
Areas of Beijing